The 2015–16 James Madison Dukes women's basketball team represents James Madison University during the 2015–16 NCAA Division I women's basketball season. The Dukes, led by fourteenth year head coach Kenny Brooks, play their home games at the James Madison University Convocation Center and are members of the Colonial Athletic Association (CAA). They finished the season 27–6, 17–1 in CAA play to win the CAA regular season title. They also won the CAA Tournament Championship and earned an automatic bid to the NCAA women's basketball tournament. They lost in the first round to DePaul.

On March 28, it was announced that Kenny Brooks has accepted his coaching position at Virginia Tech. He finished at James Madison with a 14-year record of 337–122.

Roster

Schedule

|-
!colspan=9 style="background:#450084; color:#C2A14D;"| Exhibition

|-
!colspan=9 style="background:#450084; color:#C2A14D;"| Non-conference regular season

|-
!colspan=9 style="background:#450084; color:#C2A14D;"| CAA regular season

|-
!colspan=9 style="background:#450084; color:#C2A14D;"| CAA Women's Tournament

|-
!colspan=9 style="background:#450084; color:#C2A14D;"| NCAA Women's Tournament

Rankings

See also
2015–16 James Madison Dukes men's basketball team

References

James Madison Dukes women's basketball seasons
James Madison
James Madison